The Association for Preserving Liberty and Property against Republicans and Levellers, also known as the Crown and Anchor Society or Crown and Anchor Association, was an English loyalist, anti-Jacobin, anti-Radical society active between late 1792 and June 1793.

The Association was founded on 20 November 1792 by John Reeves at the Crown and Anchor tavern in the Strand, London. It proved to be "staggeringly successful, outstripping even the Constitutional societies", with more than 2,000 local branches established before long. They disrupted Radicals' meetings, attacked printers of Thomas Paine's works, initiated prosecutions for sedition and published loyalist pamphlets. A letter to Reeves of 1792 proposed the use of ballads for propaganda:It occurred to me, that anything written in voice [?verse] & especially to an Old English tune … made a more fixed Impression on the minds of the Younger and Lower Class of People, than any written prose, which was often forgotten as soon as Read … By printing copies of the enclosed, as Common Ballads, and putting them in the hands of individuals, or by twenties in the hands of Ballad Singers who might sing them for the sake of selling them, I own I shall not be displeased to hear Re-echoed by Every Little Boy in the Streets during the Christmas Holidays – Long May Old England, Possess Good Cheer and Jollity Liberty, and Property and no Equality.The Crown and Anchor association met for the final time on 21 June 1793. These loyalist associations mostly disappeared within a year "after successfully suppressing the organizations of their opponents".

See also 
 Republicanism in the United Kingdom
 Levellers

Notes

Further reading
D. E. Ginter, 'Loyalist Association movement of 1792–3 and British public opinion', Historical Journal, ix (1966).
Austin Mitchell, 'The Association movement of 1792–3', Historical Journal, iv (1961).

1792 establishments in Great Britain
1793 disestablishments in Great Britain